KBBV-CD, virtual and UHF digital channel 19, is a low-power, Class A TeleXitos-affiliated television station licensed to Bakersfield, California, United States. The station is owned by Jaco Communications, LLC.

History

KBBV-CD was previously leased by Valley Public Television and was used to rebroadcast KVPT to the Bakersfield area on channel 65. The station later carried America One, and announced an affiliation with Estrella TV in March 2010.

Pappas Telecasting sold the station to Jaco Communications in 2011. The station changed affiliations to TeleXitos in 2017; the station was flipped to Azteca América in July 2019.

References

 

BBV-CD
Television channels and stations established in 1992
Low-power television stations in the United States
TeleXitos affiliates
Diya TV affiliates